Not Now, Comrade is a 1976 British comedy film directed by Ray Cooney. It was a follow-up to the similarly named 1973 farce Not Now, Darling. It featured a number of British comedy actors including Leslie Phillips, Windsor Davies, Don Estelle and Ian Lavender. The film was shot at Elstree studios, and was intended as the second in a series of ‘Not Now’ films, with 'Not Now, Prime Minister' pencilled in as a follow-up, but box office returns for the film, unlike those of its predecessor, were disappointing. Cooney also appears as the MI5 agent Mr Laver. The film was the first and only time that Harold Snoad directed a feature film.

Plot
Russian ballet dancer Rudi Petrovyan wants to defect. Unable to reach the British embassy and pursued by the KGB, he hides out with, and falls for, stripper Barbara Wilcox. But Rudi's planned escape in the boot of a Triumph backfires when he climbs into the wrong car, and he ends up in the country home of unsuspecting naval Commander Rimmington (Leslie Phillips).

Cast
 Leslie Phillips as Commander Rimmington
 Roy Kinnear as Hoskins
 Windsor Davies as Constable Pulford
 Don Estelle as Bobby Hargreaves
 Michele Dotrice as Nancy Rimmington
 Ray Cooney as Mr Laver
 June Whitfield as Janet Rimmington
 Carol Hawkins as Barbara Wilcox
 Lewis Fiander as Rudi Petrovyan
 Ian Lavender as Gerry Buss
 Richard Marner as 1st Russian official
 Michael Sharvell-Martin as 2nd Russian official

Stage origins
Ray Cooney's 1964 play Chase Me, Comrade was based on the 1961 defection of Rudolf Nureyev.  First appearing in 1964 at the Theatre Royal, Windsor Cooney himself played Gerry Buss.  The play became a Whitehall farce running for 765 performances between 1964 and 1966.  It was televised by the BBC's Laughter from the Whitehall in August 1964  and again in December 1967.  Cooney published a 1966 novelisation of the play. In 1981 Dutch television transmitted a version of the play called Een Kus van een Rus'.

Critical reception
The British Comedy Guide called the film "a really delightful forgotten gem of British cinema comedy". However, the Radio Times called it a "horrid comedy of errors," adding "for the sake of a hard-working cast, let's draw a discreet Iron Curtain over the whole charade"; while Time Out said it was "from the darkest days of British cinema, a farrago which began life as Cooney's Whitehall farce, Chase Me, Comrade''."

Songs
 "Not Now"
Sung by Don Estelle  
Lyric by Sammy Cahn 
Composed by Walter Ridley

References

External links
 

1976 films
British spy comedy films
Films shot at EMI-Elstree Studios
Films based on works by Ray Cooney
Films set in England
Films set in London
1970s spy comedy films
1970s political comedy films
British political comedy films
1970s English-language films
1970s British films